The Book of Law is the debut studio album by American singer-songwriter Lawrence Rothman. It was released on October 13, 2017 through Downtown Records.

Track listing

References

2017 debut albums
Downtown Records albums
Albums produced by Justin Raisen